The Council of States (Maǧlis al-Wilāyāt) is the currently-dissolved upper house of the parliament of Sudan. It was formed in 2005 as part of the Comprehensive Peace Agreement (CPA) which establishment of bicameral National Legislature. The members are indirectly elected by state legislatures and serve five-year terms.

The National Legislature, which includes the Council of States, was dissolved on 11 April 2019 following the overthrow of President Omar al-Bashir and his National Congress Party in a military coup.

As part of the 2019 Sudanese transition to democracy, a Transitional Legislative Council is to be formed which will function as the legislature of Sudan until elections scheduled for 2022.

Presidents of the Council of States

References

External links 

Politics of Sudan
Sudan
National Legislature (Sudan)
2005 establishments in Sudan